Peshwa Bajirao is an Indian Hindi historical drama television series, which broadcast from 23 January 2017 to 25 August 2017 on Sony TV. The series is based on a Peshwa of the Maratha Empire, Bajirao I, who ruled under the Chhatrapati known as Shahu. The series was produced by Sphere Origins of Sunjoy Waddhwa and creatively produced by Nilanjana Purkayasstha's company Invictus T Mediaworks. The series was aired on weekdays.

Plot
The series chronicles the journey of Bajirao in becoming a Peshwa and a great Maratha warrior battling the Mughal Empire under the tutelage of his mother, father and the noble teacher Brahmanendra Swami and would also touch his arrange marriage with Kashibai and with Mastani.

Cast
Karan Suchak as Bajirao I
Rudra Soni as young Bajirao I
Ishita Ganguly as Kashibai
Manish Wadhwa as Balaji Vishwanath
Megha Chakraborty as Mastani
 Saurabh Ghokhale as Chimaji Appa
Anuja Sathe/ Rajeshwari Sachdev as Radhabai
Rahul Singh as Aurangzeb
Manish Khanna as Bahadur Shah I
Sameer Dharmadhikari as Chhatrapati Shahu
Pallavi Joshi as Tarabai
Ravindra Mankani as Brahmanendra Swami
Yuri Suri as Qamar-ud-din Khan, Asif Jah I
Deepshikha Nagpal as Zeenat-un-Nissa
Vishal Jethwa as Nasir Jung
Sanjay Batra as Dhanaji Jadhav
 Amit Behl as Shripatrao Pant Pratinidhi
 Chetan Hansraj as Muhammad Azam Shah
 Neetha Shetty as Savitribai Bhosle
 Pankaj Berry as Krishnaji Bhatt
 Shailesh Datar as Mahadji Krishna Joshi, Kashibai's father
 Preeti Puri as Shiu Krishna Joshi, Kashibai's mother
 Kapil Arya as Chandrasen Jadhav
 Dolly Sohi as Ruhanabai, Mastani's mother
 Dinesh Mehta as Jagat Raj
 Madan Joshi as Raja Chhatrasal
 Ekroop Bedi as Bhiubai Ghorpade
 Rushiraj Pawar as Young Malhar Rao Holkar
 Nitin Prabhat as young Chhatrapati Shahu
Sumit Kaul as Muhammad Kam Bakhsh
Syed Aman Mian Sharma as Ballu Phadke
 Pravisht Mishra as Young Shivaji II
 Vishnu Sharma as Bappaji Rao Ketkar

Guest appearances
 Aditya Redij as Shivaji
Siddharth Nigam as younger Shivaji
 Ishant Bhanushali as Vishesh
 Pawan Chopra as Rajaram Chhatrapati
 Roma Bali as Rajasbai

References

2017 Indian television series debuts
2017 Indian television series endings
Hindi-language television shows
Indian historical television series
Indian period television series
Television shows set in Pune
Television shows set in Mumbai
Sony Entertainment Television original programming
Television shows set in Maharashtra
Television series set in the 18th century
Mughal Empire in fiction
Cultural depictions of Aurangzeb
Cultural depictions of Shivaji